Ante Bukvić (born 14 November 1987) is a Luxembourger international footballer who plays club football for FC Yellow Boys Weiler-La-Tour, as a defender.

Born in Zadar, SR Croatia, SFR Yugoslavia, he has been playing football for Luxembourg national football team since 2009.

Career
Ahead of the 2019–20 season, Bukvić joined FC Yellow Boys Weiler-La-Tour.

References

External links
 
 

1987 births
Living people
Luxembourgian people of Croatian descent
Luxembourgian footballers
FC Differdange 03 players
FC RM Hamm Benfica players
Luxembourg National Division players
Luxembourg international footballers
Croatian emigrants to Luxembourg
Sportspeople from Zadar
Association football defenders